Jinghai District is a district of the municipality of Tianjin, People's Republic of China, located in the southwest portion of the municipality, bordering Hebei province to the south and west, Xiqing District to the north and northeast, and Binhai to the east. It is the birthplace of Huo Yuanjia.

Administrative divisions
There are 16 towns and 2 townships in the district:

Climate

References

External links

Districts of Tianjin